Congomys is a genus of rodent in the family Muridae. Both species in this genus were formerly classified in Praomys, and both are endemic to the Democratic Republic of Congo.

The two species in this genus are:

 Lukolela swamp rat, Congomys lukolelae
 Verschuren's swamp rat, Congomys verschureni

References 

Congomys
 
Rodent genera